Bhagyashree Thipsay (née Sathe; born 4 August 1961) is an Indian chess player holding the title of Woman International Master (WIM). She won five times the Indian Women's Championship (1985, 1986, 1988, 1991 and 1994) and the Asian Women's Championship in 1991. In 1984 she was joint winner with Vasanti Unni of the British Ladies' Championship. She competed in the Women's World Chess Championship 2000, losing in the first round to Peng Zhaoqin.

She is recipient of Padma Shri and Arjuna award. After marriage to the chess Grandmaster Praveen Thipsay she changed her name to Bhagyashree Sathe Thipsay. She works for IDBI as an officer in Mumbai.

References

External links

1961 births
Living people
Indian female chess players
Recipients of the Arjuna Award
Sportswomen from Maharashtra
Recipients of the Padma Shri in sports
Articles created or expanded during Women's History Month (India) - 2014
Sportspeople from Mumbai
Chess Woman International Masters
20th-century Indian women
20th-century Indian people